Max Dyche (born 22 February 2003) is an English professional footballer who plays as a defender for Northampton Town.

Career
Dyche began his career with Northampton Town. He made his debut on 12 December 2020 against Crewe Alexandra, as a substitute for Christopher Missilou in the 72nd minute of the game. The match ended 2–1 to Crewe. Dyche made his first start against Oxford United on 15 December 2020, the match finishing 4–0 to Oxford. On 4 February 2022, he joined National League North leaders Brackley Town on loan to aid his development.

Career statistics

Personal life
Dyche is one of the two children of Sean Dyche, the current Everton manager.

References

2003 births
Living people
Footballers from Northampton
English footballers
Association football fullbacks
Northampton Town F.C. players
Kettering Town F.C. players
Brackley Town F.C. players
English Football League players
National League (English football) players